Hayama (written: 葉山, 羽山, 端山 早山, or 早間) is a Japanese surname. Notable people with the surname include:

, Japanese footballer
, Japanese actor and model
, Japanese voice actress
, Japanese ice hockey player
, Japanese singer
, Japanese actress
, Japanese footballer
Tomoaki Hayama, Japanese mixed martial artist
, Japanese writer

Fictional characters
, a character in the manga series Shokugeki no Sōma
, a character in the light novel series My Youth Romantic Comedy Is Wrong, As I Expected
, a character in the anime series Saint October
, protagonist of the manga series Chu-Bra!!
, a character in the manga series Three Leaves, Three Colors
, a character in the visual novel Kono Aozora ni Yakusoku o

Japanese-language surnames